The meridian 76° east of Greenwich is a line of longitude that extends from the North Pole across the Arctic Ocean, Asia, the Indian Ocean, the Southern Ocean, and Antarctica to the South Pole.

The 76th meridian east forms a great circle with the 104th meridian west.

From Pole to Pole
Starting at the North Pole and heading south to the South Pole, the 76th meridian east passes through:

{| class="wikitable plainrowheaders"
! scope="col" width="120" | Co-ordinates
! scope="col" | Country, territory or sea
! scope="col" | Notes
|-
| style="background:#b0e0e6;" | 
! scope="row" style="background:#b0e0e6;" | Arctic Ocean
| style="background:#b0e0e6;" |
|-valign="top"
| style="background:#b0e0e6;" | 
! scope="row" style="background:#b0e0e6;" | Kara Sea
| style="background:#b0e0e6;" | Passing just west of Vize Island, Krasnoyarsk Krai, 
|-
| 
! scope="row" | 
| Yamalo-Nenets Autonomous Okrug — Vilkitsky Island
|-
| style="background:#b0e0e6;" | 
! scope="row" style="background:#b0e0e6;" | Kara Sea
| style="background:#b0e0e6;" | Passing just west of Neupokoyeva Island, Yamalo-Nenets Autonomous Okrug, 
|-
| 
! scope="row" | 
| Yamalo-Nenets Autonomous Okrug — Gydan Peninsula
|-
| style="background:#b0e0e6;" | 
! scope="row" style="background:#b0e0e6;" | Khalmyer Bay
| style="background:#b0e0e6;" |
|-
| 
! scope="row" | 
| Yamalo-Nenets Autonomous Okrug — Gydan Peninsula
|-
| style="background:#b0e0e6;" | 
! scope="row" style="background:#b0e0e6;" | Taz Estuary
| style="background:#b0e0e6;" |
|-valign="top"
| 
! scope="row" | 
| Yamalo-Nenets Autonomous Okrug Khanty-Mansi Autonomous Okrug — from  Tomsk Oblast — from  Omsk Oblast — from Novosibirsk Oblast — from  Omsk Oblast — from Novosibirsk Oblast — from 
|-
| 
! scope="row" | 
| Passing through Lake Balkhash
|-
| 
! scope="row" | 
|
|-valign="top"
| 
! scope="row" | 
| Xinjiang — passing through the city of Kashgar
|-
| 
! scope="row" | 
| Gilgit-Baltistan — for about 11 km, claimed by 
|-valign="top"
| 
! scope="row" | 
| Xinjiang — for about 8 km
|-
| 
! scope="row" | 
| Gilgit-Baltistan — for about 14 km, claimed by 
|-valign="top"
| 
! scope="row" | 
| Xinjiang — for about 16 km
|-
| 
! scope="row" | 
| Gilgit-Baltistan — claimed by 
|-valign="top"
| 
! scope="row" | 
|-
| style="background:#b0e0e6;" | 
! scope="row" style="background:#b0e0e6;" | Indian Ocean
| style="background:#b0e0e6;" |
|-
| style="background:#b0e0e6;" | 
! scope="row" style="background:#b0e0e6;" | Southern Ocean
| style="background:#b0e0e6;" |
|-
| 
! scope="row" | Antarctica
| Australian Antarctic Territory, claimed by 
|-
|}

See also
75th meridian east
77th meridian east

e076 meridian east